Govind Patel is an Indian politician associated with Bharatiya Janata Party. He was a State Minister for Energy & Petrochemicals and Science & Technology. He is a Member of Legislative assembly from Rajkot South constituency in Gujarat for its 12th, 13th and 14th legislative assembly.

References

Gujarat MLAs 2012–2017
Bharatiya Janata Party politicians from Gujarat
Living people
People from Rajkot
Gujarat MLAs 2007–2012
State cabinet ministers of Gujarat
Gujarat MLAs 2017–2022
Year of birth missing (living people)